This is a list of individuals who are or were natives of, or notable as residents of, or in association with the city of Racine, Wisconsin, USA.

Arts

 Kevin J. Anderson, author
 Gene Beery, artist
 Frank Bencriscutto, conductor, composer
 Karen Johnson Boyd, heiress, art dealer
 Lane Brody, born Lynn Voorlas, singer
 Mellona Moulton Butterfield, china painter, teacher
 Joyce Carlson, artist
 Jason Paul Collum, author, film and television director
 Chi Coltrane, musician
 Chester Commodore, cartoonist, nominated for the Pulitzer Prize 12 times
 Ellen Corby, actress
 Victor DeLorenzo, drummer, Violent Femmes
 Peter Deming, cinematographer
 Payne Erskine, writer
 Norman D. Golden II, actor
 Greg Graffin, lead vocalist of political punk rock band Bad Religion
 Chad Harbach, author
 Max Hardcore (Paul F. Little), pornographer
 Ben Hecht, journalist, playwright and screenwriter
 Kevin Henkes, author and Caldecott Medal winner
 Lise Hilboldt, actress
 Harriet Persis Hurlbut, artist
 Zachary Scot Johnson, singer-songwriter
 David Kherdian, writer, poet and editor
 Larry Kusche, commercial pilot and author
 Fredric March, two-time Oscar-winning actor
 Barbara McNair, singer and actress
 Tina Moore, R&B singer
 Glenn C. Nelson, ceramics educator and author
 Milton K. Ozaki, mystery writer
 Irene Purcell, actress, lived and died in Racine
 Warner Richmond, actor
 Liamani Segura, child singer
 Ben Sidran, musician
 Kristin Bauer van Straten, actress
 Joseph Philbrick Webster, songwriter and composer

Athletics

 Ellen Ahrndt, AAGPBL player
 Bill Albright, NFL player
 Kevin Barry, NFL player
 Caron Butler, NBA player
 Pancho Carter, NASCAR driver
 Jim Chones, NBA player
 John Clay, NFL player
 Dorothy Damaschke, AAGPBL player
 Margaret Danhauser, AAGPBL player
 Norm Derringer, AAGPBL manager
 Bob Foster, NFL player
 Jimmy Grant, MLB player
 Jim Haluska, NFL player
 Steve Hanson, NFL player
 Jack Harris, NFL player
 Fritz Heinisch, NFL player
 Don Heinkel, MLB player
 Sonja Henning, WNBA player
 Joe Jagersberger, racing and car designer
 Jason Jaramillo, MLB player
 Abdul Jeelani, NBA player
 Kaitlin Keough, cyclist
 Ed Killian, MLB player
 Duane Kuiper, MLB player and broadcaster
 Glen Kuiper, MLB broadcaster
 Jeff Lee, NFL player
 Laurie Ann Lee, AAGPBL player
 Frances Lovett, AAGPBL player
 Ed Lytle, baseball player
 Chris Maragos, NFL player
 Jesse Marsch, Manager of Leeds United
 Jim McIlvaine, NBA player
 Kim Merritt, long-distance runner
 Jerry Mertens, NFL player
 Brent Moss, NFL player
 Leo Murphy, baseball player and manager
 Norm Nelson, stock car racer
 Dick Phillips, MLB player
 Eric Rasmussen, MLB player
 Linda L. Rice, thoroughbred racehorse trainer
 Shane Rawley, MLB pitcher
 Gene H. Rose, NFL player
 Vinny Rottino, MLB player
 Babe Ruetz, NFL head coach
 Howie Ruetz, NFL player
 Joe Ruetz, football player
 Charles Rutkowski, NFL player
 Alex Scales, NBA player
 Tom Sorensen, Olympic volleyball player
 Jack Taschner, MLB player
 Ralph Thomas, NFL player
 Tim Van Galder, NFL player
 Fred Venturelli, NFL player
 Jamil Wilson (born 1990),NBA player 
 Al Zupek, NFL player

Business
 Jerome Case, inventor
 Albert J. Dremel, founder of the Dremel company
 George N. Gillett Jr., owner of the Montreal Canadiens ice hockey team; co-owner of Premier League team, Liverpool F.C. and the NASCAR auto racing team Gillett Evernham Motorsports
 Jay Grinney, President and Chief Executive Officer of Birmingham, Alabama-based HealthSouth Corporation
 Jon Hammes, founder and managing partner of Hammes Company
 Herbert Fisk Johnson, Jr., former head of S.C. Johnson & Son
 Herbert Fisk Johnson, Sr., former head of S.C. Johnson & Son
 Herbert Fisk Johnson III, Chairman and CEO of S.C. Johnson & Son, member of the Forbes 400
 Samuel C. Johnson, industrialist (wax)
 Samuel Curtis Johnson, Sr., founder of S.C. Johnson & Son
 Helen Johnson-Leipold, CEO of Johnson Outdoors
 Jim Jorgensen, entrepreneur; Discovery Zone, AllAdvantage and Women's Sports Foundation
 Craig Leipold, majority owner of NHL's Minnesota Wild
 John "Jack" Rogan, founder of Rogan's Shoes
 Don Smiley, President and CEO of Summerfest and former Major League Baseball executive
 Fred Young, President and CEO of Young Radiator

Military
 Harold C. Agerholm, USMC Private First Class, World War II, Medal of Honor recipient
 James Roy Andersen, USAAF Brigadier General
Arthur S. Born, U.S. Navy Rear Admiral
 Charles F. Born, U.S. Army and Air Force Major General
 Dominic A. Cariello, Wisconsin Army National Guard Brigadier General
 Clinton W. Davies, U.S. Air Force Brigadier General
Gregory A. Feest, U.S. Air Force Major General
 Irving Fish, U.S. Army Major General
 George Clay Ginty, Union Army Brigadier General
 John L. Jerstad, Major, USAAF, World War II aviator and Medal of Honor recipient

Politics and law

 Robert H. Baker, Wisconsin legislator, Racine mayor and alderman, chairman of the Wisconsin Republican Party
 Olympia Brown, minister and champion of women's suffrage
 George L. Buck, Wisconsin legislator and businessman
 Melbert B. Cary, chairman of the Connecticut Democratic Party
 Champion S. Chase, mayor of Omaha, Nebraska; namesake of Chase County, Nebraska
 Carl C. Christensen, Wisconsin legislator and businessman
 Joseph Clancy, Wisconsin legislator and businessman
 Henry A. Cooper, U.S. Representative
 Thomas P. Corbett, Wisconsin legislator and jurist
 Marcel Dandeneau, Wisconsin educator and politician
 John Dickert, Racine mayor
 John Dixon, Wisconsin legislator and businessman
 Joshua Eric Dodge, Wisconsin Supreme Court
 James Rood Doolittle, U.S. Senator
 Henry Dorman, Wisconsin legislator
 John Elkins, Wisconsin legislator
 Edward Engerud, Justice of the North Dakota Supreme Court
 Thomas Falvey, Wisconsin legislator and Racine mayor
 Margaret Farrow, first female lieutenant governor of Wisconsin
 Scott C. Fergus, Wisconsin legislator
 Peter C. Fishburn, mathematician who (with Steven Brams) rediscovered approval voting
 Gerald T. Flynn, U.S. Representative
 Willis Frazell, Wisconsin legislator and barber
 William C. Giese, Wisconsin legislator and educator
 Walter Goodland, Governor of Wisconsin
 George Groesback, member of the Montana House of Representatives
 Joseph C. Hamata, Wisconsin legislator and businessman
 Ole Hanson, mayor of Seattle, Washington; founder of San Clemente, California and co-founder of Lake Forest Park, Washington
 James M. Hare, Michigan Secretary of State
 Jack Harvey, Wisconsin politician
 Max W. Heck, Wisconsin politician and jurist
 Richard P. Howell, Wisconsin legislator, carpenter, and businessman
 Wallace Ingalls, Wisconsin legislator and lawyer
 Lorenzo Janes. Wisconsin territorial legislator, lawyer, and businessman
 Charles Jonas, Lieutenant Governor of Wisconsin
 John Lehman, Wisconsin legislator and educator
 William P. Lyon, 7th Chief Justice of the Wisconsin Supreme Court, 12th Speaker of the Wisconsin State Assembly, Union Army officer
 Harry Mares, former Mayor of White Bear Lake, MN, Minnesota state representative and educator
 Cory Mason, Wisconsin legislator and current Mayor of Racine
 Henry F. Mason, Kansas legislator
 John G. McMynn, Wisconsin Superintendent of Public Instruction
 Gwen Moore, U.S. Representative
 Peter C. Myers, Missouri politician
 Greta Neubauer, Wisconsin legislator
 Jeffrey A. Neubauer, Wisconsin legislator and businessman, former Chairman of the Democratic Party of Wisconsin
 Lisa Neubauer, Wisconsin judge
 Wallace E. Nield, Wisconsin politician
 Don Penza, former Mayor of Wisconsin Rapids, WI, All-American collegian football player, legendary football coach
 George Petak, Wisconsin politician
 P. Walter Petersen, Wisconsin politician
 Kimberly Plache, Wisconsin politician
 James F. Rooney, Wisconsin legislator, former Chairman of the Wisconsin Waterways Commission
 Sidney A. Sage, Wisconsin politician
 Horace T. Sanders, Wisconsin politician and military leader
 M. M. Secor (Martin Mathias Secor), proprietor of M. M. Secor Trunk Company; mayor of Racine 1884–1888
 John L. Sieb, Wisconsin politician and barber
 Lawrence H. Smith, U.S. Representative
 Lynn E. Stalbaum, U.S. Representative
 Jacob Stoffel Jr., Wisconsin politician
 Robert L. Turner, Wisconsin legislator and Vietnam War veteran
 William L. Utley, Wisconsin politician and military leader
 John C. Wagner, Wisconsin politician and businessman
 Van H. Wanggaard, Wisconsin legislator
 Paul Weyrich, American religious conservative political activist and commentator
 Philo White, U.S. diplomat

Religion
 Anton Marius Andersen, Lutheran minister
 James DeKoven, Episcopal clergyman
 Francis J. Haas, Roman Catholic bishop
 Richard J. Sklba, Roman Catholic bishop
 Rose Thering, Racine Dominican sister; professor at Seton Hall University

Other
 Laurel Clark, astronaut; died on reentry in her first space flight on Space Shuttle Columbia
Ethel B. Dietrich, economist, foreign service officer
 Marguerite Davis, co-discoverer of vitamins A and B
 Cory Everson, six-time winner of Miss Olympia bodybuilding contest
 Paul P. Harris, founder of Rotary International
 William D. Lutz, linguist
F. Don Miller, executive director of the USOC

References

Racine, Wisconsin
 
Racine